Lilly Saini Singh (born September 26, 1988) is a Canadian YouTuber. Singh began making YouTube videos in 2010. She originally appeared under the pseudonym Superwoman (stylized IISuperwomanII), her YouTube username until 2019. In 2016, she was included in Forbes list of world's highest paid YouTubers ranking third and earning a reported $7.5 million. By 2017, she was ranked tenth on the Forbes list of the world's highest-paid YouTube stars, earning a reported $10.5 million; as of February 2022 she has 14.7 million subscribers and over three billion video views. Forbes named her one of the 40 most powerful people in comedy in 2019. She has received an MTV Fandom Award, four Streamy Awards, two Teen Choice Awards and a People's Choice Award.

In 2016, Singh released her first film, a documentary chronicling her world tour, entitled A Trip to Unicorn Island. In March 2017, she released her first book, How to Be a Bawse: A Guide to Conquering Life, which reached number one on the New York Times best-seller list. From September 2019 to June 2021, Singh acted as executive producer and host of the NBC late-night talk show A Little Late with Lilly Singh. She is the first person of Indian descent to host an American major broadcast network late-night talk show.

Early life and education
Singh was born and raised in the Scarborough district of Toronto, Ontario, Canada. Her parents, Malvindar Kaur and Sukvindar Singh, are Indian Punjabi immigrants of Saini Rajput descent from Hoshiarpur, Punjab, India, and raised her as a Sikh. Her older sister Tina (born 1982) is also a YouTuber; she makes videos about her family life with her husband and their three sons. Singh had said she was a tomboy as a child. She attended Mary Shadd Public School during her elementary years, and in 2006, she graduated from Lester B. Pearson Collegiate Institute in Malvern, Toronto, where she returned as an alumna to visit her old teachers. She was a member of Girl Guides of Canada and participated in their youth programs. In 2010, she graduated from York University in Toronto with a Bachelor of Arts in Psychology.

Career

Creating YouTube channel and rise to popularity (2010–2014)

In October 2010, Singh started a YouTube channel under the pseudonym "IISuperwomanII". She has explained that the name Superwoman was prompted by a childhood idea, making her believe she could do anything. Starting out, Singh had intended to go to graduate school as her parents had requested, but chose to make YouTube videos and decided that she would return to graduate school if her YouTube career did not progress.

In December 2011, Singh created a second channel called "SuperwomanVlogs", now titled "Lilly Singh Vlogs", where she chronicles her daily activities and includes behind the scenes footage from her videos. She used it as a second channel to upload videos until August 2014, when she began uploading vlogs. Singh appeared as a background dancer in the movies Speedy Singhs and Thank You in 2011. When Singh acquired 100,000 subscribers in 2012, she applied to YouTube for monetization on her videos. When YouTube accepted, Singh "became more career-minded" and bought her first camera for $699.

In August 2013, Singh was featured alongside Jassi Sidhu in his Punjabi song Hipshaker. Singh rapped in the song Mauj Ki Malharein, which played in the Bollywood drama Gulaab Gang in August 2014. In July of the same year, she released a song titled #LEH in a collaboration with her friend, author and rapper Kanwer Singh, who is known by the pseudonym "Humble the Poet". In 2014, Singh appeared in a small role in the Canadian production Dr. Cabbie.

In 2014, her channel ranked at #39 on New Media Rockstars Top 100 Channels. The same year, she was nominated for a Shorty Award and a Streamy Award.

World tour, move to Los Angeles, and documentary (2015–2016)
She recorded and released another music video in February 2015 titled The Clean Up Anthem in collaboration with Canadian artist Sickick. 
In March 2015, Singh began a world tour called "A Trip to Unicorn Island", adapting her YouTube content and including singing, dancing, music performances, comedy, and her parent characters. Her tour covered India, Australia, Hong Kong, Singapore, Dubai, Canada, Trinidad and Tobago, the United Kingdom, and the United States. She documented the tour in her first feature movie, A Trip to Unicorn Island, which also describes how YouTube fame is affecting her life. The movie was released on February 10, 2016, on YouTube Red (now called YouTube Premium). She describes the film as being very "raw and genuine".

In April 2015, Singh released a song about her hometown Toronto in collaboration with Humble the Poet titled #IVIVI (roman numerals for 416, Toronto's area code).
In September 2015, People magazine included Singh on their annual "Ones to Watch" list. Lilly received her first MTV Fandom Award, was nominated for two Teen Choice Awards, and won her first Streamy Award later that year.

In December 2015, she moved to Los Angeles to further her career.

In October 2016, she ranked 8th on Forbes list of World's Top-Earning YouTube Stars of 2015. She was also featured in Fast Company Magazine as the 100 Most Creative People in Business. Variety magazine recognized her as one of their 10 Comics to Watch for 2016, and she was honored at the Just For Laughs Film Festival in Montreal. In July 2016, she won two Teen Choice Awards from her three nominations.

In 2016, she voiced miniature unicorns named Bubbles and Misty in the animated film Ice Age: Collision Course and played a cameo role in the movie Bad Moms.

Continued popularity, debut book and Unicorn Island Productions (2017–2018) 

In January 2017, she won a People's Choice Award for "Favorite YouTube Star". In September 2017, Singh won her fourth Streamy Award.

Her first book, How to Be a Bawse: A Guide to Conquering Life, was released on March 28, 2017. The book reached No. 1 on the New York Times bestseller list. She won the award for Best Non-Fiction at the 2017 Goodreads Choice Awards. Her 2017 world tour was centered around the book release and key concepts she discussed.  A successor book, titled Be A Triangle, was released on April 5, 2022.
Singh was cast in HBO's film adaptation of Fahrenheit 451 after recording an audition outside an Internet café in Melbourne, Australia. She was in the region to promote her book and rushed the audition at her agent's urging around 2 a.m. in May 2017. She plays the character of Raven, "a tabloid blogger who works with the fire department to spread the ministry's propaganda by broadcasting their book-burning raids to fans".

In October 2017, she hosted SlutWalk, an initiative started by Amber Rose.

In November 2017, Lilly Singh was also chosen as an ambassador for Pantene shampoo and partnered with Calvin Klein. In 2018, Singh appeared in the music video for Maroon 5's "Girls Like You" featuring Cardi B.

In 2018, Singh was to star in NBC pilot Bright Futures. The show was later cancelled by NBC and the pilot episode was left unaired.

On April 13, 2018, Singh announced that she had launched her own production company Unicorn Island Productions. The company is based in Los Angeles, California.

A Little Late with Lilly Singh, and other ventures (2019–present)
In March 2019, NBC announced that Singh would host a new late night talk show, A Little Late with Lilly Singh, which succeeded Last Call with Carson Daly following its series finale later in the year. The show premiered on September 16, 2019, to positive reviews by critics.

In August 2019, Singh dropped the name "Superwoman" in an Instagram post.

Born to Sikh parents and raised Sikh herself, Singh nevertheless garnered controversy for her remarks on turbans. During a visit to Jessica Alba's home, Singh met Alba's two young daughters who were both wearing twisted towels on their heads, to which Singh responded "They look like my Punjabi friends [...]" On September 27, 2019, BBC reported that Singh had apologized for an on-air joke that compared turbans to bath towels, in which members of the Sikh religion, who wear turbans for spiritual reasons, were angered by her remarks on NBC, with the BBC remarking that "[Singh] has used her platform to often call out public figures who she says deserve to be 'cancelled' for their offences."

On October 19, 2019, Singh was named one of Vogue Indias Women of the Year. Singh was nominated for "Audience Choice Creator of the Year" at the 9th Streamy Awards. She also was placed on Time's 100 Next, a list highlighting rising stars in different industries.

On May 13, 2020, NBC renewed A Little Late With Lilly Singh for a second season. It premiered on January 11, 2021.

On May 28, 2020, Singh partnered with the video-sharing app TikTok to start creating videos on the app. As of October 2022, she has over 1.4 million followers and over 26 million total likes on the app.

In July 2020, Singh announced that she and other celebrities were bringing a National Women's Soccer League team to Los Angeles. Angel City FC is expected to play in 2022.

On August 18, 2020, Singh announced on the Today Show that she will be getting her own sketch comedy show, called Sketchy Times with Lilly Singh. NBC ordered 2 episodes of the show and was shot and filmed in Singh's home. The show was released on October 29, on Peacock.

On September 1, 2020, Singh and other celebrities partnered with the Los Angeles 2028 Olympics organizing committee to create one of many emblems for the 2028 Summer Olympics. Her "A" represents pride.

On September 11, 2020, it was announced that Singh will voice Penny in Riverdance: The Animated Adventure. It was also announced in October that Singh would be voicing a character in another movie, titled Hitpig. She will voice Pickles.

On February 4, 2021, it was reported that Singh would be partnering with children's media company PocketWatch, to create her own animated musical short film titled Lilly Singh's Proud Princess. The show is centered around the theme of LGBTQ pride.

On May 6, 2021, Singh and NBC announced that A Little Late with Lilly Singh will end after 2 seasons. Singh signed onto a comedy project (produced by Kenya Barris) on Netflix. She and her Unicorn Island Productions banner struck a deal with Universal Television Alternative Studio.

She appears as Liv in the second season of the Hulu series Dollface, which premiered on February 11, 2022. In October 2021, it was announced that Singh would be a judge on the second season of Canada's Got Talent, which premiered in March 2022. She is also set to star in The Muppets Mayhem for Disney+, which was announced on March 7, 2022. She will also produce and star in YouTube original series Mindful Adventures in Unicorn Island, set to release in 2023.

On April 6, 2022, Singh released her new book, Be A Triangle.

In October 2022, it was announced that Singh would host CTV's new primetime quiz show titled Battle of the Generations.

In March 2023, Singh co-hosted the 95th Academy Awards preshow.

Activism

Advocacy
Singh expressed her support for the George Floyd protests, and attended one herself in Los Angeles. She was featured in a campaign fundraiser for the Joe Biden 2020 presidential campaign. Singh also expressed her support for the 2020–2021 Indian farmers' protest, in various social media posts.

Philanthropy 
In 2017, Lilly Singh was announced as a UNICEF Goodwill Ambassador, to advocate for children's rights. She has led a campaign called "GirlLove", promoting girls to end girl-on-girl bullying. In July 2018, Lilly travelled to South Africa to meet the students of elementary schools who spoke against bullying and classroom violence.

Public image 
Punjabi culture is frequently portrayed in her videos, which contain satires on people's complaints and prominent issues. Her most popular video is Three Girls, One Elevator (ft. Zendaya & Winnie Harlow) which also promotes her women's empowerment campaign GirlLove, and her most popular series features her fictional parents, Paramjeet and Manjeet, both played by Singh herself, reacting to trending and controversial videos. She also frequently collaborates with celebrities on her videos.

Allegations of cultural appropriation
Singh has been accused of cultural appropriation of African-American culture by such publications as The Huffington Post, Bitch, ColorLines, and Vice. Anna Silman of The Cut accused Singh of appropriating both black and Indo-Caribbean culture on her channel because of her tendency to don a "blaccent", whilst making rap videos sporting chains and cornrows. Tayo Bero of Teen Vogue wrote that "[Singh] falls into a category of non-black people of color in entertainment who have built massive followings often by mimicking black culture and leaning heavily into black stereotypes." Rachna Raj Kaur and Radheyan Simonpillai of Now similarly criticized Singh's appropriation of black culture due to her use of braids, hip-hop slang and Caribbean accents. Singh has responded to the criticism, by stating her mannerisms are due to her upbringing, adding "all my friends from Scarborough [Toronto] act exactly like me."

Personal life 
Singh is an Indo-Canadian who developed a strong connection with her Punjabi heritage during visits to India. Although raised as a Sikh, she stated in an Instagram post that she does not follow any religion but she strongly believes in God. She struggled with depression and arachnophobia and began making YouTube videos as a way of dealing with her feelings. As a young adult, she lived with her parents in Markham, Ontario. In February 2019, Singh came out as bisexual via social media.

Filmography

Film

Television

Web

Music videos

Discography

Singles

Bibliography
 How to be a Bawse: A Guide to Conquering Life (2017)
 Be A Triangle: How I Went From Being Lost Into Getting My Life Into Shape (2022)

Awards and nominations

See also
 South Asian Canadians in the Greater Toronto Area

Notes

References

External links
 

1988 births
Living people
21st-century Canadian actresses
21st-century Canadian comedians
21st-century Canadian non-fiction writers
21st-century Canadian women writers
21st-century Canadian LGBT people
Actresses from Toronto
Actresses from Ontario
Actresses in Hindi cinema
Bisexual actresses
Bisexual comedians
Canada's Got Talent judges
Canadian actresses of Indian descent
Canadian bloggers
Canadian expatriate actresses in the United States
Canadian film actresses
Canadian people of Punjabi descent
Canadian Sikhs
Canadian television actresses
Canadian television talk show hosts
Canadian women bloggers
Canadian women comedians
Canadian writers of Asian descent
Comedians from Toronto
Comedy YouTubers
Late night television talk show hosts
Canadian LGBT actors
LGBT Sikhs
LGBT YouTubers
Sikh writers
Streamy Award winners
Women writers of Indian descent
Writers from Scarborough, Toronto
York University alumni
YouTube channels launched in 2010
YouTube controversies
YouTube vloggers
Canadian LGBT comedians
Canadian bisexual writers